The Battle off Kallarawa was a naval battle that occurred on March 25, 2008 after a Sea Tiger patrol was intercepted by a Sri Lankan naval patrol.

Background 
The previous day a Dvora Fast Attack Craft blew up due to Sea Tiger activity, either due to a sea mine or a suicide semi submersible.  The rebels claimed however that a 45-minute battle had destroyed the craft although another Dvora sent to investigate failed to find evidence of such.  The next day a rebel patrol was sighted and the Sri Lankan Navy sent a force to intercept it.

Battle 
The government craft sighted the rebel craft near the coast at around 1 am local time. Over a dozen rebel craft where engaged and at least one was damaged before the rebel force withdrew. The engagement lasted for three hours. The Sri Lanka Navy claimed that they did not suffer any casualties but did disable a rebel boat. It further claimed that the Sea Tigers withdrew from the sea.

Sources
 http://www.sundaytimes.lk/080330/Columns/sitreport.html
 http://news.bbc.co.uk/2/hi/south_asia/7312791.stm
 http://www.colombopage.com/archive_08/March25135935JR.html

2008–2009 Sri Lankan Army Northern offensive
Naval battles involving Sri Lanka
March 2008 events in Asia